Walter Schneider (born 13 June 1928, died in 2007 or 2008) was a Swiss freestyle swimmer. He competed at the 1948 Summer Olympics and the 1952 Summer Olympics.

References

External links
 

1928 births
2000s deaths
Swiss male freestyle swimmers
Olympic swimmers of Switzerland
Swimmers at the 1948 Summer Olympics
Swimmers at the 1952 Summer Olympics
Place of birth missing